Charlotte Angus (February 2, 1911 – May 12, 1989) was an American artist.

History
A native of Kansas City, Missouri, Angus moved to Philadelphia when young and grew up in that city. She studied at the University of the Arts and the Graphic Sketch Club there before taking a job with an advertising agency, which she lost due to the Great Depression. She then, in 1936, became involved with the Federal Art Project, beginning by painting sets for the Federal Theater Project and continuing by contributing to the Index of American Design. At the end of the project in 1942 she studied drafting, taking a position as a draftswoman at the Naval Air Medical Center in Philadelphia. She also created posters for the Works Progress Administration. Angus married John Stefanak in 1947 and settled with him in southwestern Pennsylvania, where she continued to exhibit her art. She died in Pulaski, Pennsylvania, and is buried in Saint Ann's Cemetery in Hermitage.

A lithograph by Angus, Derelicts, is owned by the Spencer Museum of Art. Much of the work she produced for the Index of American Design is currently held by the National Gallery of Art. She also has work held at The Newark Museum of Art

References

External links

1911 births
1989 deaths
American women painters
20th-century American painters
20th-century American women artists
Artists from Kansas City, Missouri
Artists from Philadelphia
Painters from Missouri
Painters from Pennsylvania
Federal Art Project artists
Works Progress Administration in Pennsylvania
University of the Arts (Philadelphia) alumni